was a feudal domain under the Tokugawa shogunate of Edo period Japan, in what is now Tottori Prefecture on the island of Honshu. It controlled all of Inaba Province and virtually all of Hōki Province was centered around Tottori Castle, and was ruled throughout its history by a branch of the Ikeda clan. Tottori Domain was dissolved in the abolition of the han system in 1871 and is now part of Tottori Prefecture. In addition, the two branches of the Arao clan, who served as hereditary karō of the clan and castellans of Yonago Castle (15,000 koku) and Kurayoshi Jin'ya (12,000 koku) both had kokudaka equivalents to that of daimyō.

History
In 1600, after the Battle of Sekigahara, Ikeda Tsuneoki's third son, Ikeda Nagayoshi (Ikeda Terumasa's younger brother) was awarded estates in Hōki Province with a kokudaka of 60,000 koku by Tokugawa Ieyasu. This marked the start of Tottori Domain. In 1615, his son Ikeda Nagayoshi (長幸) was transferred to Bitchū-Matsuyama Domain, and in his place, Ikeda Mitsumasa (the eldest son of Ikeda Toshitaka, the son of Ikeda Terumasa) was transferred from Himeji Domain to an expanded Tottori Domain (325,000 koku) which now included most of Inaba Province as well as Hōki Province. During his 16 year tenure, he built the foundations of the castle town of Tottori.

In 1632, when his uncle Ikeda Tadao, of Okayama Domain died, Mitsumasa exchanged Tottori for Okayama and the clan chieftaincy. Ikeda Tadao's son, Ikeda Mitsunaka became daimyō of Tottori at the age of two, and his descendants would continue to rule the domain to the end of the Edo period. Although the Ikeda clan of Tottori was reduced to a branch of the clan, it was Ikeda Tadao's lineage which was in direct descent from Ikeda Terumasa and Tokugawa Ieyasu's second daughter, Tokuhime, so the Ikeda clan of Tottori was regarded by the Tokugawa shogunate as a kunimochi daimyō clan  independent of the head of the Ikeda family of Okayama Domain. In addition to being allowed to use the honorific surname "Matsudaira", the Tottori Ikeda were also allowed the use of the Tokugawa family crest, as well as being formally recognized as Tokugawa relatives (shinpan.  Normally, when a daimyō entered Edo Castle, he had to leave his sword with a retainer in front of the entrance. In addition to the Tottori Ikeda family, the privilege of retaining one's sword was granted only to the Kaga-Maeda clan and the Tokugawa clan's closest relations, which were the Tottori-Ikeda clan, the Aizu-Matsudaira clan, and the Echizen-Matsudaira clan.

The domain maintained a secondary castle at Yonago, and jin'ya in other important towns within the domain, such as Kurayoshi, Yahashi, Matsuzaki, and Uradome. The domain suffered greatly from the Tenpō famine from 1833 to 1837. 

During the Bakumatsu period, the 12th daimyō, Ikeda Yoshinori, was the older brother of the 15th Shogun, Tokugawa Yoshinobu and had a difficult position between loyalty to the shogunate and the growing forces for the Meiji restoration.  Within the domain, conflicts between the loyalists and the pro-Tokugawa factions were intense, and in 1863, an assassination of a senior vassal of the pro-shogunate faction occurred at Honkoku-ji in Kyoto. In the following year, when Chōshū Domain, with which he had a close relationship, was defeated in the Kinmon Incident and was declared enemy of the crown, he began to distance himself from politics, but in the Battle of Toba-Fushimi in 1868 and the Boshin War, he was on the side of the Meiji government army. As a result, he led the clan's forces in various battles. He was awarded 30,000 koku by the new Meiji government. The domain became part of Tottori Prefecture with the abolition of the han system in 1871. Ikeda Terutomo, the 15th chieftain of the clan, was made a marquis in the kazoku peerage in 1884.

Holdings at the end of the Edo period
As with most domains in the han system, Tottori Domain consisted of several discontinuous territories calculated to provide the assigned kokudaka, based on periodic cadastral surveys and projected agricultural yields, g. 

Inaba Province  (entire province)
51 villages in Iwai District
60 villages in Hōmi District
89 villages in Hattō District
63 villages in Yakami District
98 villages in Chizu District
35 villages in Ōmi District
82 villages in Takakusa District
83 villages in Keta District

Hōki Province  
114 villages in Kawamura District
120 villages in Kume District
107 villages in Yabase District
185 villages in Aimi District
65 villages in Aseri District 
170 villages in Hino District 

Musashi Province 
1 village in Chichibu District

List of daimyō 

{| class=wikitable
! #||Name || Tenure || Courtesy title || Court Rank || kokudaka 
|-
|colspan=6|  Ikeda clan, 1600-1617 (Tozama)
|-
||1||||1600 - 1614||Bitchū-no-kami (備中守)|| Junior 5th Rank, Lower Grade (従五位下)||60,000 koku 
|-
||2||||1614 - 1617||Bitchū-no-kami (備中守)|| Junior 5th Rank, Lower Grade (従五位下)||60,000 koku 
|-
|colspan=6|  Ikeda clan, 1617-1632 (Tozama)
|-
||1||||1614 - 1632||Sakon'e-gon-shōshō (左近衛権少将)|| Junior 4th Rank, Lower Grade (従四位下)||320,000 koku 
|-
|colspan=6|  Tottori-Ikeda clan, 1632-1871 (Tozama, but equivalent to Shinpan)
|-
||1||||1632 - 1685||Sakon'e-no-shōshō (左近衛少将)|| Junior 4th Rank, Lower Grade (従四位下)||325,000 koku 
|-
||2||||1685 - 1700||Hōki-no-kami (伯耆守); Sakon'e-no-shōshō (左近衛少将)|| Junior 4th Rank, Lower Grade (従四位下)||325,000 koku 
|-
||3||||1700 - 1739||Sagami-no-kami (相模守); Jijū (侍従)|| Junior 4th Rank, Lower Grade (従四位下)||325,000 koku 
|-
||4||||1739 - 1747||Sagami-no-kami (相模守); Jijū (侍従)|| Junior 4th Rank, Lower Grade (従四位下)||325,000 koku 
|-
||5||||1747 - 1783||Sagami-no-kami (相模守); Sakon'e-no-shōshō (左近衛少将)|| Junior 4th Rank, Lower Grade (従四位下)||325,000 koku 
|-
||6||||1783 - 1798||Sagami-no-kami (相模守); Jijū (侍従)|| Junior 4th Rank, Lower Grade (従四位下)||325,000 koku 
|-
||7||||1798 - 1807||Sagami-no-kami (相模守); Jijū (侍従)|| Junior 4th Rank, Lower Grade (従四位下)||325,000 koku 
|-
||8||||1807 - 1830||Sagami-no-kami (相模守); Sakon'e-no-chūshō (左近衛中将)|| Junior 4th Rank, Upper Grade (従四位上)||325,000 koku 
|-
||9||||1830 - 1841||Sagami-no-kami (相模守); Sakon'e-no-shōshō (左近衛少将)|| Junior 4th Rank, Upper Grade (従四位上)||325,000 koku 
|-
||9||||1841 - 1848||Sagami-no-kami (相模守); Sakon'e-no-shōshō (左近衛少将)|| Junior 4th Rank, Upper Grade (従四位上)||325,000 koku 
|-
||10||||1848 - 1850||Sagami-no-kami (相模守); Jijū (侍従)|| Junior 4th Rank, Upper Grade (従四位上)||325,000 koku 
|-
||11||||1850 - 1871||Sagami-no-kami (相模守); Sakon'e-no-chūshō (左近衛中将)|| Junior 4th Rank, Upper Grade (従四位上)||325,000 koku 
|-
|-
|}

Simplified family tree (Ikeda daimyō of Tottori)

Ikeda Tsuneoki (1536–1584)
Terumasa, 1st Lord of Himeji (1565–1613)
Toshitaka, 2nd Lord of Himeji (1584–1616)
 I. Mitsumasa, 3rd Lord of Himeji, 1st Lord of Tottori (2nd creation) (1609–1682; Lord of Himeji: 1614–1617; Lord of Tottori: 1617–1632)
Tsunamasa, 2nd Lord of Okayama (3rd creation) (1638–1714)
Masazumi, 6th Lord of Amaki (1706–1766)
Shizuko, m. Ichijō Michika (1722–1769)
Ichijō Mitsuruko (1752–1786), m. Tokugawa Harumori, 6th Lord of Mito (1751–1805)
Tokugawa Harutoshi, 7th Lord of Mito (1773–1816)
Tokugawa Nariaki, 9th Lord of Mito (1800–1860)
 XII. Ikeda (Tokugawa) Yoshikatsu, 12th Lord of Tottori, 12th family head (1837–1877; r. 1850–1869; Governor: 1869–1871; family head: 1869–1877), m. Ikeda Hiroko (1842–1872; see below)
Terutomo, 13th family head, 1st Marquess (1852–1890; family head: 1877–1890; 1st Marquess: 1884)
Kyōko (1884–1923). m. Ikeda (Tokugawa) Nakahiro, 14th family head, 2nd Marquess (1877–1948; family head: 1890–1948; 2nd Marquess: 1890–1946)
Narizane, 15th family head (1904–1993; family head: 1948–1993). He adopted a son:
 Toshio, 16th family head (b. 1934)
Tadakatsu, 2nd Lord of Okayama (2nd creation) (1602–1632)
 I. Mitsunaka, 1st Lord of Tottori (3rd creation) (1630–1693; r. 1632–1685)
 II. Tsunakiyo, 2nd Lord of Tottori (3rd creation) (1648–1711; r. 1685–1700)
Nakasumi, Lord of Tottori-Shinden (1650–1722)
 III. Yoshiyasu, 3rd Lord of Tottori (3rd creation) (1687–1739; r. 1700–1739)
 IV. Muneyasu, 4th Lord of Tottori (3rd creation) (1717–1747; r. 1739–1747)
 V. Shigenobu, 5th Lord of Tottori (3rd creation) (1746–1783; r. 1747–1783)
 VI. Harumichi, 6th Lord of Tottori (3rd creation) (1768–1798; r. 1783–1798)
 VII. Narikuni, 7th Lord of Tottori (3rd creation) (1787–1807; r. 1798–1807)
 VIII. Naritoshi, 8th Lord of Tottori (3rd creation) (1788–1830; r. 1807–1830)
  IX. Narimichi, 9th Lord of Tottori (3rd creation) (1830–1841; r. 1830–1841)
Nakamasa, 7th Lord of Tottori-Shinden (1780–1841)
Nakanori, 8th Lord of Tottori-Shinden (1805–1850)
 X. Yoshiyuki, 10th Lord of Tottori (3rd creation) (1832–1848; r. 1841–1848)
 Seiko (1834–1879) m.  XI. Ikeda (Maeda) Yoshitaka, 11th Lord of Tottori (3rd creation) (1834–1850; r. 1848–1850)
Teruzumi, Lord of Shikano (1604–1662)
Masatake, 2nd Lord of Fukumoto (1649–1687)
Masachika (1684–1751)
Masakatsu (1709–1782)
Sadatsune, 5th Lord of Wakasa (1767–1833)
Sadayasu, 7th Lord of Wakasa (1805–1847)
Hiroko (1842–1872). m.  XII. Ikeda (Tokugawa) Yoshikatsu, 12th Lord of Tottori (see above)
 I. Nagayoshi, 1st Lord of Tottori (1st creation) (1570–1614; r. 1600–1614)
  II. Nagayuki, 2nd Lord of Tottori (1st creation) (1587–1632; r. 1614–1617)

Shikano Domain
In 1685, Ikeda Mitsunaka gave 25,000 koku of new rice lands to his second son, Ikeda Nakazumi, and established a cadet branch of the clan. On August 7, 1702, during the last years of Ikeda Nakazumi's reign, an additional 5,000 koku was added to bring the kokudaka of the domain to 30,000 koku.  It existed as a "paper domain" throughout most of the Edo period with its revenues coming from the treasury of the parent domain, but on December 10, 1868, a jin'ya was established in what is now the Shikano neighborhood of the city of Tottori. Domain administration was practically non-existent, with officials dispatched from Tottori Domain in charge of domain affairs. The domain existed primarily as "insurance" to prevent attainder of the parent domain should the ruling daimyō die without a successor. In fact, Ikeda Yoshiyasu, the third daimyō  of Tottori, and Ikeda Yoshiyuki, the tenth daimyō  of Tottori, were adopted from Shikano Domain.

On June 27, 1864, the ninth daimyō  of the domain, Ikeda Nakatatsu, committed seppuku after a confrontation with Ikeda Yoshinori, the daimyō of Tottori, over the dispatch of troops to Kyoto. In 1869, the domain was abolished and absorbed back into Tottori Domain. In 1884, a descendant of the last daimyō  of Shikano became a viscount in the kazoku peerage.

{| class=wikitable
! #||Name || Tenure || Courtesy title || Court Rank || kokudaka
|-
|colspan=6|  Ikeda clan, 1600-1617 (Tozama)
|-
||1||||1685 - 1703||Iki-no-kami (壱岐守)|| Junior 5th Rank, Lower Grade (従五位下)||25,000 ->30,000 koku 
|-
||2||||1703 - 1753||Buzen-no-kami (豊前守)|| Junior 5th Rank, Lower Grade (従五位下)||30,000 koku 
|-
||3||||1753 - 1758||Settsu-no-kami (摂津守)||  Junior 5th Rank, Lower Grade (従五位下)||30,000 koku 
|-
||4||||1758 - 1769||Hida-no-kami (飛騨守)|| Junior 5th Rank, Lower Grade (従五位下)||30,000 koku 
|-
||5||||1769 - 1771||Shuri-no-Suke (修理亮)|| Junior 5th Rank, Lower Grade (従五位下)||30,000 koku
|-
||6||||1771 - 1785|| || Junior 5th Rank, Lower Grade (従五位下)||30,000 koku
|-
||7||||1785 - 1824||Settsu-no-kami (摂津守)||  Junior 5th Rank, Lower Grade (従五位下)||30,000 koku 
|-
||8||||1824 - 1850||Iki-no-kami (壱岐守))||  Junior 5th Rank, Lower Grade (従五位下)||30,000 koku
|-
||9||||1850 - 1864||Sakon’e-no-shōgen (左近将監))||  Junior 5th Rank, Lower Grade (従五位下)||30,000 koku
|-
||10||||1864 - 1869||’Settsu-no-kami (摂津守)||  Junior 5th Rank, Lower Grade (従五位下)||30,000 koku 
|-
|-
|}

Wakasa Domain
In 1700, Ikeda Tsunakiyo, the second daimyō  of Tottori gave 15,000 koku of new rice lands to his younger brother Ikeda Kiyosada, and established a cadet branch of the clan. In 1720, an additional 5,000 koku was added to bring the kokudaka of the domain to 20,000 koku.  As with Shikano Domain, Wakasa existed as a "paper domain" throughout most of the Edo period with its revenues coming from the treasury of the parent domain, but on December 10, 1868, a jin'ya was established in what is now the Wakasa neighborhood of the city of Tottori. Domain administration was practically non-existent, and officials dispatched from Tottori Domain were in charge of all local domain affairs. The fifth daimyō, Ikeda Sadatsune was a noted  literary scholar.  In 1884, a descendant of the last daimyō  of Wakasa became a viscount in the kazoku peerage.

{| class=wikitable
! #||Name || Tenure || Courtesy title || Court Rank || kokudaka
|-
|colspan=6|  Ikeda clan,' 1600-1617 (Tozama)
|-
||1||||1700 - 1718||Kawachi-no-kami (河内守)|| Junior 5th Rank, Lower Grade (従五位下)||15,000 koku 
|-
||2||||1718 - 1736||Omi-no-kami (近江守)|| Junior 5th Rank, Lower Grade (従五位下)||15,000 -> 20,000 koku 
|-
||3||||1736 - 1768||Hyōgo-no-kami (兵庫頭)||  Junior 5th Rank, Lower Grade (従五位下)||20,000 koku 
|-
||4||||1768 - 1773||Osumi-no-kami (大隈守)|| Junior 5th Rank, Lower Grade (従五位下)||20,000 koku 
|-
||5||||1773 - 1802||Nuido-no-kami (縫殿頭)|| Junior 5th Rank, Lower Grade (従五位下)||20,000 koku|-
||6||||1802 - 1807|| || Junior 5th Rank, Lower Grade (従五位下)||20,000 koku|-
||7||||1808 - 1847||Nagato-no-kami (長門守)||  Junior 5th Rank, Lower Grade (従五位下)||20,000 koku 
|-
||8||||1847 - 1858||Awaji-no-kami (淡路守))||  Junior 5th Rank, Lower Grade (従五位下)||20,000 koku|-
||9||||1858 - 1862||Saemon-no-suke (左衛門佐))||  Junior 5th Rank, Lower Grade (従五位下)||20,000 koku|-
||10||||1862 - 1870||Sagami-no-kami (相模守)||  Junior 5th Rank, Lower Grade (従五位下)||20,000 koku'' 
|-
|-
|}

See also

 List of Han
 Abolition of the han system

References 

Domains of Japan
History of Tottori Prefecture
Inaba Province
Hōki Province
Chūgoku region
Ikeda clan
1600 establishments in Japan
States and territories established in 1600
1871 disestablishments in Japan
States and territories disestablished in 1871